The Adventures of Twizzle is a television show produced by AP Films and Gerry Anderson. Conceived by author Roberta Leigh, later a co-producer, the children's show premiered in 1957. The show follows a young boy named Twizzle and his companions on adventures. Twizzle has the ability to extend his arms and legs. Although 52 episodes of the show were created during the show's year-long run in 1957, only one of the episodes has managed to survive. This sole episode was released on the Space Patrol box set. The series was one of the first shows to use intricate puppetry which would prove important in later shows developed by Gerry Anderson.

Overview
Twizzle's legs looked suspiciously like drinking straws with lines around them in a swirling pattern and undoubtedly the figure was pushed up from below while the straw-like legs were twisted around to give the "Twizzle" effect. In the first episode, Twizzle originally lived in a toy shop and cost two shillings and six pence (12.5p) and was nearly sold to a naughty girl named Sally Cross but he hid and escaped that night before the child returned the following day to buy him. He travelled some distance and the next night hides in a dog kennel where he finds Footso, a cat who has run away from home as the children made fun of his big feet.

Twizzle proved useful in a fire by saving a child on a high window when no ladder was available for which he was given a racing car as a reward but after crashing it he swapped it for a breakdown truck which he uses for rescuing toys. Footso had large feet which sometimes trip him up, hence his name. Later came Jiffy the Broomstick Man (a cross between a broom made of twigs and a suit wearing man who could sweep the floor on his own) who Twizzle and Footso rescued from the clutches of a stereotypical evil witch (who had threatened to burn him) when he flew up the chimney to escape her. The witch returned in a later episode and there was another narrow escape by all. Jiffy could fly by lying horizontal and would fly other people out of trouble. Twizzle and Footso built Straytown where stray toys (misfits) could live and lived in a cabin there. This theme was later carried over to Torchy the Battery Boy. Both ideas bear a resemblance to Peter Pan and Neverneverland.

All had their songs which were entertaining time-wasters, with Footso "dreaming of herrings and kippers and creamy cream" after which he'd say "Purr! Purr! Purr! Meowwll!", the latter loudly and then the show would continue (a theme Anderson later carried into Four Feather Falls). The songs were written by Roberta Leigh. There was also Chawky the white faced Golliwog who would complain: "Who wants a white-faced Golliwog?" and Candy Floss, a "Mamma Doll" who could not say "mamma" as well as Bouncy, a ball who had lost his bounce. There was also a thin Teddy Bear as well as a China Doll and a Jack in the Box. An occasional visitor to Straytown was The Toy Inspector who would check on the toys living there.

Annual
There was a British annual brought out in 1960 by Brin Brothers Ltd, called More Twizzle Adventure Stories, "The lovable T.V. character by Roberta Leigh". It had 91 pages of text stories and comic style stories (18 of them with the one page introduction). Illustrations were by F. Woof. Apart from the covers and frontispiece which are in full colour, the rest of the illustrations are black and white with one other colour (red, orange, blue or green). The annual is printed on cheap cardboard-like paper and is now very rare although it is not sought after by collectors.

References

External links

Episode guide by Fanderson, the official Gerry Anderson appreciation society

1950s British children's television series
1957 British television series debuts
1958 British television series endings
AP Films
Black-and-white British television shows
British children's fantasy television series
British television shows based on children's books
British television shows featuring puppetry
English-language television shows
ITV children's television shows
Marionette films
Sentient toys in fiction
Television series about cats